Jassen may refer to:

 Jass, Switzerland's national card game also called Jassen
 Jassen Cullimore